Richard G. Whitehead is an American dental surgeon who has been designated as Southern Virginia University's interim president.

Whitehead has an associate degree from Dixie State College of Utah, a bachelor's degree from Brigham Young University and a DDS from Creighton University.  He did an internship at the University of Maryland.  Starting in 1997 he was head of institutional advancement at Dixie State College.  He later served as a mission president for the Church of Jesus Christ of Latter-day Saints and then became a vice president for institutional advancement at Southern Virginia University.

Sources
Deseret News June 10, 2011

Utah Tech University alumni
Brigham Young University alumni
Creighton University alumni
American dentists
American leaders of the Church of Jesus Christ of Latter-day Saints
Mission presidents (LDS Church)
Southern Virginia University people
Living people
American dentistry academics
Latter Day Saints from Utah
Latter Day Saints from Nebraska
Latter Day Saints from Maryland
Latter Day Saints from Virginia
Year of birth missing (living people)